Alternative is a political party in Mauritania. The party won in the 19 November and 3 December 2006 elections 1 out of 95 seats.

Political parties in Mauritania